The 1947 Avon by-election was a by-election held during the 28th New Zealand Parliament in the Christchurch electorate of Avon. The by-election occurred following the death of MP Dan Sullivan and was won by John Mathison.

Background
Dan Sullivan, who was first elected to represent Avon for the Labour Party in 1919, died on 8 April 1947. This triggered the Avon by-election, which occurred on 28 May 1947.

Candidates
Labour
There were six nominations for the Labour Party nomination:

Archie Grant, secretary of the Canterbury Trades Council of the Federation of Labour
Mrs. A. J. Jones, a charity worker and member of Labour's Aranui branch
Margaret Mackwell, the matron of the Glendower Maternity Hospital and member of the Canterbury Trained Nurses' Association
George Manning, a Christchurch City Councillor and secretary of the Canterbury branch of the Workers' Educational Association

Two other expected candidates, Jack Roberts and Alan Sharp, declined nomination. With Roberts' declination Mathison was seen as the frontrunner for the nomination. Mathison was subsequently selected as Labour's nominee.

National
Dr. Robert Alexander McDowell, a medical doctor from Kaiapoi and representative of the Canterbury division on the council of the New Zealand branch of the British Medical Association, was the only nominee for the National Party candidacy.

Others
John Ramby Robertson was an independent candidate. Robertson was a member of the Democratic Labour Party (DLP) but his nomination was refused endorsement by DLP leader John A. Lee. Robertson had stood unsuccessfully as a DLP candidate for the Christchurch City Council in 1944.

The Communist Party decided not to put forward a candidate. The party's Christchurch secretary, Jack Locke, stated his party had no wish to embarrass the Government (whose policies they mostly supported) by drawing away votes.

Previous election

Results
The following table gives the election results:

Mathison obtained 65.31% of the votes and was successful.

See also
List of New Zealand by-elections
1887 Avon by-election

Notes

References

Politics of Christchurch
1947 elections in New Zealand
By-elections in New Zealand
1940s in Christchurch
May 1947 events in New Zealand